Roundstone Creek is a stream located entirely within Rockcastle County, Kentucky.

Roundstone Creek was descriptively named for the round stones within its course.

See also
List of rivers of Kentucky

References

Rivers of Rockcastle County, Kentucky
Rivers of Kentucky